Black Heat is a 1976 blaxploitation action film directed and produced by Al Adamson. The film stars Timothy Brown, Russ Tamblyn and Geoffrey Land. The film was renamed to Girl's Hotel for play at drive in theaters, then later changed to Murder Gang.

The plot is about a Las Vegas detective named "Kicks" Carter (Brown) who attempts to foil arms dealers selling weapons to Central America. At the same time, he seeks to save some women who are forced to work as prostitutes to pay off gambling debts.

Plot

Kicks Carter is a streetwise policeman whose beat is Las Vegas. A crime gang is running guns, selling drugs, loan-sharking, and running a prostitution ring out of an upscale hotel in the city and Kicks is trying to put them out of business. But the interference of a woman reporter is making his job more difficult.

Cast
 Timothy Brown as Kicks Carter
 Russ Tamblyn as Ziggy
 Jana Bellan as Terry
 Geoffrey Land as Tony
 Regina Carrol as Valerie
 Al Richardson as Alphonse
 Tanya Boyd as Stephanie
 Darlene Anders as Fay

References

External links
 

1976 films
Blaxploitation films
American action thriller films
1970s action thriller films
American police detective films
1970s English-language films
Films directed by Al Adamson
1970s American films